Fintan O'Leary (born 1 September 1986) is an Irish hurler who plays for club side Ballinhassig and is a former player with divisional side Carrigdhoun and at inter-county level with the Cork senior hurling team.

Honours

Waterford Institute of Technology
Fitzgibbon Cup (2): 2006/2008

Ballinhassig
Munster Intermediate Club Hurling Championship (1): 2005
Cork Premier Intermediate Hurling Championship (2): 2005, 2012
All-Ireland Junior Club Hurling Championship (1): 2003
Munster Junior Club Hurling Championship (1): 2002
Cork Junior Hurling Championship (1): 2002
South East Junior A Hurling Championship (1): 2002

Cork
All-Ireland Intermediate Hurling Championship (1): 2006
Munster Intermediate Hurling Championship (2): 2006, 2015
Munster Under-21 Hurling Championship (1): 2007
Munster Minor Hurling Championship (1): 2004

References

1986 births
Living people
Ballinhassig hurlers
Carrigdhoun hurlers
Cork inter-county hurlers
Waterford IT hurlers